Katri Helena Kalaoja (née Koistinen, born 17 August 1945) is a Finnish singer.

Career 
Katri Helena released her first songs in 1963 and has since sold over 630,000 certified records, which makes her the second-best-selling female soloist in Finland behind Madonna and places her also among the top 20 best-selling music artists in the Finnish market. She has represented Finland twice in the Eurovision Song Contest: in 1979 with her song "Katson sineen taivaan" and in 1993 with "Tule luo". She also took part in the International Sopot Festival in 1969, singing "Valssi" during the Polish day.

Personal life 
Katri Helena has been married three times. She had two daughters and a son with her husband Timo Kalaoja, who died of a heart attack in 1988. His death affected her so much that she withdrew from public view and stopped performing and recording for four years. Her only son, Juha Kalaoja, died at age 33 on 29 April 2009.

Discography

Albums
 Vaalea valloittaja, 1964
 Puhelinlangat laulaa, 1964
 Katri Helena, 1966
 Katupoikien laulu, 1967
 Paikka auringossa, 1968
 Ei kauniimpaa, 1969
 Kai laulaa saan, 1971
 Lauluja meille kaikille, 1972
 Kakarakestit, 1973
 Kun kohdattiin, 1973 
 Paloma Blanca, 1975 
 Lady Love, 1976 
 Ystävä, 1978 
 Katson sineen taivaan, 1979
 Sydämeni tänne jää, 1980 
 Kotimaa, 1981
 Minä soitan sulle illalla, 1982
 Kirje sulle, 1984 
 On elämä laulu, 1986
 Almaz, 1988
 Juhlakonsertti, 1989
 Anna mulle tähtitaivas, 1992 
 Lähemmäksi, 1993
 Vie minut, 1995
 Hiljaisuudessa, 1996
 Missä oot, 1998
 Leidit levyllä, 2000 
 Tässä tällä hetkellä, 2004
 Elämänlangat, 2006 
 Hiljaisuudessa, 2006
 Tulet aina olemaan, 2009 
 Valon maa, 2011
 Sinivalkoinen, 2012
 Taivaan tie, 2014
 Niin on aina ollut, 2015

Singles
 "Vierellesi kaipaan" (with Jari Sillanpää) (2007)
 "Taivaan Tie" (2014)

See also
List of best-selling music artists in Finland

References
 Official home page.

External links
 

1945 births
Living people
People from Tohmajärvi
20th-century Finnish women singers
Eurovision Song Contest entrants for Finland
Eurovision Song Contest entrants of 1979
Eurovision Song Contest entrants of 1993
21st-century Finnish women singers